Storm the Court (foaled  May 5, 2017) is an American Thoroughbred racehorse and the winner of the 2019 Breeders' Cup Juvenile.

Career

Storm the Court's first race was on August 10, 2019 at Del Mar Racetrack, where he came in first.

On September 2, 2019, he competed in the Grade 1 2019 Del Mar Futurity, but did not finish after a collision with another horse, Eight Rings.

In his third race on September 27, 2019, he competed in the Grade 1 2019 American Pharoah Stakes. He finished in third place in the race, which was coincidentally won by Eight Rings.

On November 1, 2019, at 45:1 odds, he won the 2019 Breeders' Cup Juvenile, this time defeating Eight Rings. Due to this win, he earned consideration in the 2020 Road to the Kentucky Derby.

On the 2020 Road to the Kentucky Derby, as well as winning the Juvenile, Storm the Court came third in the 2020 San Felipe Stakes, and third in the 2020 Ohio Derby. In the 2020 Kentucky Derby, run in September rather than in May, Storm the Court went off at 27–1 and finished sixth in a field of 15.

Pedigree

References

2017 racehorse births
Breeders' Cup Juvenile winners
Racehorses bred in Kentucky